Harry Preston (born Harry Pimm; September 4, 1923 – November 23, 2009) was an author and Hollywood screenwriter. His credits included over 90 published books and over 300 films of all types, from feature films to industrials, commercials, documentaries and training films.

Early life and education
Harry Preston was born Harry Pimm in Durban, South Africa. His father was Richard Henry Pimm, a chemist who migrated from Tamworth, England, to Cape Town, South Africa, where he opened a chemist shop. After moving to Kimberly, SA, Henry Pimm married Lilian Catherine Walter, daughter of George A. Walter, a US Vice Consul to South Africa starting in 1872. While living in Kimberly, the Walters became family friends of Cecil Rhodes, founder of the De Beers Diamond Company. Henry and Lilian Pimm eventually moved to Durban, where Henry and his brother, William Pimm, founded WR Pimm & Co., a local chain of chemist shops.

His family moved to Durban after the crash of 1929, where he attended St. Henry's Marist Brothers' College, a co-educational private school with a Catholic foundation in Glenwood, Durban, KwaZulu-Natal, South Africa. Harry Pimm spent ten years at St. Henry's, where he received an in-depth primary education, matriculating at the age of fifteen as the youngest student up to that time ever to graduate. Several months wait were required before his enrolment at the University of Natal because the minimum age limit for college was sixteen. Harry Pimm began writing children's stories and books while still in his teens, moving on quickly to writing adult articles and short stories for major South African newspapers and magazines.

Biography

Harry Pimm moved to the U.S. in 1948. When he became an American citizen, he changed his last name to Preston. He settled in Dallas, Texas, where he began writing and directing low-budget films for the young Dallas film industry.

While news editor at WFAA-TV, Channel 8, the ABC station in Dallas, Harry Preston wrote TORNADO, a documentary on the devastating tornado in Dallas in 1957, which won the Sylvania Award. He also wrote several Dallas television series, notably Spotlight on Texas sponsored by Southwestern Bell Telephone, as well as writing many Viewpoint columns in the Dallas Morning News.

In 1959, Harry Preston moved to California, where he joined Metro-Goldwyn-Mayer Studios as an analyst and rewrite man. The writers’ strike in 1962 forced him to move east to join the famous Jam Handy Studios in Detroit, where one of his commercials (for “Religion in American Life”) was nominated for an industry award.

After the Detroit riots of 1967, he returned to the West Coast, where he resumed work authoring fiction and non-fiction books. His book Everything a Teenager Wants to Know About Sex and Should (Books for Better Living) received rave reviews and went into seven printings.

Among Harry Preston’s many novels are 14 romance novels he wrote for MacFadden which were published under the pseudonym “Vanessa Cartwright”.

Following a year's visit to Cape Town in 1971, he wrote a supernatural horror tale set in South Africa called Queen of Darkness (Manor Books). During the 1970s, he also wrote many training films for the United States Air Force at Norton AFB in California.

In 1976, Mr. Preston moved back to Dallas and now works closely with the Texas film and literary communities. In 1989 he received a Life Achievement Award at the Corpus Christi Film Festival for his contribution to the Texas film industry. Since 1990 he has taught screenwriting at Richland College in Dallas and actively markets scripts and books through his literary agency - Stanton & Associates Literary Agency.

In 2002, his biography of former Broadway and movie star Thelma White, titled Thelma Who? was published by Scarecrow Press and was selected as one of the top ten best books of 2002 by CLASSIC IMAGES, the national movie magazine. In 2003, Mr. Preston's latest novels Faces of Angels and Shot in Dallas were published.

Harry Preston's biography Omar Sharif Loved My Cheescake is currently being considered for publication.

Selected bibliography

As Harry Preston
 Everything a Teenager Wants to Know About Sex and Should (Books for Better Living, 1973)
 The Natural Food Reducing Diet (Books for Better Living, 1974)
 Queen of Darkness (Manor Books, 1976)
 I Plead Insanity: When Manic Depression Turns Violent, with Paul Rollins (Odenwald Pr, 1993)
 Faces of Angels (Publish America, 2001)
 Thelma Who? Almost 100 Years of Showbiz (Scarecrow Press, Inc, 2002)
 Shot In Dallas (Publish America, 2003)

As Vanessa Cartwright
 Wine of Love MacFadden Romance Series #39.
 Appointment in Antibes MacFadden Romance Series #82.
 Wife Without Love MacFadden Romance Series #85
 Summer in Stockholm MacFadden Romance Series #93.
 Triston's Lair MacFadden Romance Series #149.

Filmography
 Honeymoon Horror (1982)

References

External links
 Harry Preston Website
 Stanton Literary Agency
 

1923 births
Writers from Durban
South African screenwriters
2009 deaths
20th-century screenwriters
South African emigrants to the United States